The 1949 World Table Tennis Championships were held in Stockholm from February 4 to February 10, 1949.

Medalists

Team

Individual

References

External links
ITTF Museum

 
World Table Tennis Championships
World Table Tennis Championships
World Table Tennis Championships
Table tennis competitions in Sweden
World Table Tennis Championships, 1949
International sports competitions in Stockholm
World Table Tennis Championships